Events from the year 2010 in Nepal.

Incumbents
President: Ram Baran Yadav 
Prime Minister: Madhav Kumar Nepal 
Vice President: Parmanand Jha
Chief Justice: 
 until 10 February: Min Bahadur Rayamajhi 
 10 February-25 March: Anup Raj Sharma
 starting 26 March: Ram Prasad Shrestha

Events
 September 17 - 12th General Convention of the Nepali Congress starts in Kathmandu.

Deaths

 20 March - Girija Prasad Koirala.

References

 
Nepal
Years of the 21st century in Nepal
2010s in Nepal
Nepal